Florence Pugh (born 3 January 1996) is an English actress. She made her acting debut in 2014 in the drama film The Falling. Pugh gained recognition in 2016 for her leading role as a young bride in the independent drama Lady Macbeth, winning a British Independent Film Award. After starring in the 2018 television film King Lear, she drew praise for her leading role in the miniseries The Little Drummer Girl and earned a nomination for the BAFTA Rising Star Award that year.

Pugh's international breakthrough came in 2019 with her portrayals of professional wrestler Paige in the biographical sports film Fighting with My Family, a despondent American woman in the horror film Midsommar, and Amy March in the period drama Little Women. For the last of these, she received nominations for an Academy Award and a BAFTA Award. Pugh was awarded the Trophée Chopard at the 2019 Cannes Film Festival. In 2021, she starred as Yelena Belova in the Marvel Cinematic Universe superhero film Black Widow and the Disney+ miniseries Hawkeye. She has since starred in the thriller Don't Worry Darling and the drama The Wonder (both 2022).

Early life
Florence Pugh was born on 3 January 1996 in Oxford to dancer Deborah and restaurateur Clinton Pugh. She has three siblings: actor and musician Toby Sebastian, actress Arabella Gibbins, and Rafaela "Raffie" Pugh. She suffered from tracheomalacia as a child, which led to frequent hospitalisations. The family relocated to Sotogrande in Spain when Pugh was three years old, hoping the warmer weather would improve her health. They lived there until she was six, when they moved back to Oxford. Also at six years old, Pugh played Mary in a school nativity play, for which she spoke in a Yorkshire accent. She was privately educated at Wychwood School and St Edward's School, Oxford, but disliked how the schools did not support her acting ambitions.

Career

Early roles (2014–2018)

While still studying in sixth form, Pugh made her professional acting debut in the 2014 drama The Falling, playing a precocious teenager opposite Maisie Williams. Tara Brady of The Irish Times deemed Pugh "remarkable", while IndieWire's Oliver Lyttelton called her "striking". In the same year, the actress was nominated for Best British Newcomer at the BFI London Film Festival as well as for Young British / Irish Performer of the Year by the London Film Critics' Circle. She was cast to portray a singer-songwriter in the dramedy pilot Studio City, co-starring Eric McCormack as the character's father, the following year. The pilot was not picked up to series. Pugh would later characterise her experience on Studio City negatively due to pressures to change her appearance.

In 2016, Pugh starred in the independent drama Lady Macbeth, a film based on the novella Lady Macbeth of the Mtsensk District by Nikolai Leskov, and appeared in the first series of the ITV detective series Marcella. In the former, she played Katherine, an unhappily married bride who grows violent. Pugh attributed her attraction to the part to her partiality for characters with "confusing or at least interesting" motivations. The role earned the actress acclaim. She also credited the production with reviving her interest in cinema after being dispirited by Studio City. Reviewing the film for Variety, Guy Lodge commended her portrayal of the character's "complex, under-the-skin transformation". She won the BIFA Award for Best Performance by an Actress in a British Independent Film for the role.

In 2018, Pugh garnered a nomination for the BAFTA Rising Star Award at the 71st British Academy Film Awards. She then played Cordelia to Anthony Hopkins' titular King Lear in Richard Eyre's television film King Lear and appeared in the short film Leading Lady Parts in support of the Time's Up initiative. Later that year, Pugh portrayed Elizabeth de Burgh in the Netflix historical film Outlaw King, co-starring Chris Pine as Robert the Bruce. Charles Bramesco of The Guardian found her to be "excellent despite her thankless role". She next starred in a six-part miniseries adaptation of John le Carré's spy novel The Little Drummer Girl, in which she played an actress who becomes embroiled in an espionage plot in the 1970s. Her performance was met with praise. While divided on the series overall, Richard Lawson of Vanity Fair credited Pugh for being "terrific throughout" and added that she "smartly mixes earthiness with sophistication, wisdom with naïveté."

Breakthrough and critical recognition (2019–present)

Pugh starred in three major films in 2019, during which she was recognised as having experienced an international breakthrough. She first played professional wrestler Paige in Fighting with My Family, a comedy-drama about Paige's career. The film premiered at the 2019 Sundance Film Festival to positive reviews. Geoffrey Macnab of The Independent credited the actress for being "completely convincing as the wrestler", adding that she showed "the same defiance, scruffy glamour and self-deprecating humour as the real life ... Paige". Pugh next headlined Ari Aster's horror film Midsommar, which chronicles an American couple, played by her and Jack Reynor, who travel to Sweden and encounter a cult. Critics complimented Pugh's portrayal of the desolate Dani Ardor, with David Edelstein of Vulture describing it as "amazingly vivid".

In her final film release of the year, Pugh starred in Little Women, a period drama film adaptation of Louisa May Alcott's novel of the same name directed by Greta Gerwig. She portrayed Amy March, a fickle artist, from age 12 into adulthood, and has said that the character is in a "sweet spot of not knowing how to deal with her emotions". The film received critical acclaim and grossed $209 million. In his review, David Rooney of The Hollywood Reporter praised the "disarming grace, humor and a willful streak that grows almost imperceptibly into wisdom" with which Pugh managed the "tricky contradictions" of the part. Pugh earned nominations for the BAFTA and Academy Award for Best Supporting Actress for her performance.

Pugh portrayed Yelena Belova, a spy, in the Marvel Cinematic Universe superhero film Black Widow. She described the film as being about "girls who are stolen from around the world". Released in 2021, the film garnered positive reviews from critics, who highlighted the actress's distinctive performance. Caryn James of BBC Culture credited Pugh for making Belova "the most vibrant person in the film, more lived-in than most action-movie characters". She reprised the role in the Disney+ series Hawkeye later in the year. 

In 2022, Pugh starred in the thriller Don't Worry Darling, directed by Olivia Wilde, and the drama The Wonder, an adaptation of Emma Donoghue's namesake novel. While filming the former, she allegedly clashed with Wilde, causing her to limit the amount of promotion she did for the film. Don't Worry Darling premiered at the 79th Venice International Film Festival, where critics deemed Pugh's performance superior to the film. In The Wonder, she played a nurse in 1862 who is sent to investigate an alleged supernatural miracle. Kevin Maher of The Times found Pugh's "impossibly vivid and convincing" performance to be the film's prime asset. In her final release of the year, she voiced Goldilocks in the DreamWorks animated film Puss in Boots: The Last Wish, which earned over $400 million worldwide.

Pugh will produce and star in Zach Braff's drama film A Good Person. She will portray Communist Party USA member Jean Tatlock in Christopher Nolan's biopic Oppenheimer, starring Cillian Murphy in the titular role. Pugh will also play Princess Irulan in Dune: Part Two, a sequel to the 2021 science fiction film. The three films are scheduled for releases in 2023.

Accolades

Pugh has been nominated for an Academy Award as well as two BAFTA Awards. She garnered an Academy Award nomination for Best Supporting Actress and a BAFTA Award nomination for Best Actress in a Supporting Role, both for her work in Little Women, as well as a BAFTA Rising Star Award nomination. Her performances in Lady Macbeth and The Wonder respectively earned her a British Independent Film Award win and another nomination. She was nominated for a Gotham Award in the Best Actress category for her role in Midsommar. At the 2019 Cannes Film Festival, Pugh was awarded the Trophée Chopard, which is given by a jury of professionals to young actors to recognise and encourage their careers.

Public image and personal life

From 2013 to 2016, Pugh performed cover songs under the name Flossie Rose on YouTube. Pugh was featured on her brother's song "Midnight", released on 15 May 2021. In 2020, she partook in the series Acting for a Cause for a live reading of Kenneth Lonergan's play This Is Our Youth to help raise funds for the Entertainment Industry Foundation, a nonprofit organisation, during the COVID-19 pandemic.

Pugh was included on the entertainment category of Forbes magazine's annual 30 Under 30 list, which recognises the 30 most influential people in Europe under the age of 30, in 2019. Time magazine placed her on the artists category of its 100 Next list, which highlights rising stars and emerging leaders in their fields, in 2021. In a 2022 readers' poll by Empire magazine, she was voted one of the 50 greatest actors of all time. Terming her "one of the very best of her generation", the magazine attributed her success to bringing "a grounded empathy to her characters".

From 2019 to 2022, Pugh was in a relationship with American actor and filmmaker Zach Braff. The two met while working together on the short film In the Time It Takes to Get There, which Braff directed, and lived together in Los Angeles.

Filmography

Film

Television

Discography

Singles

References

External links

 

1996 births
Living people
21st-century English actresses
Actresses from Oxfordshire
English expatriates in the United States
English film actresses
English television actresses
People educated at St Edward's School, Oxford
People from Oxford
Chopard Trophy for Female Revelation winners